The Mid-Western Region was a division of Nigeria from 1963 to 1991, from 1976 being known as the Bendel state.

It was formed in June 1963 from Benin and Delta provinces of the Western Region, and its capital was Benin City. It was renamed a province in 1966, and in 1967 when the other provinces were divided into several states, it remained territorially intact, becoming a state.

During the Nigerian Civil War, the Biafran forces invaded the new Mid-Western state, en route to Lagos, in an attempt to force a quick end to the war. While under Biafran occupation, the state was declared the "Republic of Benin". As Nigerian forces retook the region, the republic collapsed only a day after the declaration when Nigerian troops captured Benin City.

In 1976 the state was renamed Bendel. It was divided into Delta State and Edo State in 1991.

Demographics 
The region was composed of the old Benin and Delta Provinces. The Benin provinces had Edo speaking people while the Delta province had  Okpe, Ijaws, Isekiri, Urhobo, Isoko and Igbo (Ukwuani) speaking people excluding Ika and Aniocha.

Economy 
The region had a timber and rubber industry in Sapele which was also supported by a port. In addition, it produced palm related products, maize, beans and other food produce for household consumption. In the Southern Delta province, oil was discovered and was positioned to benefit the region.

References 

 
Former Nigerian administrative divisions
 States and territories established in 1963